The Department of Transport of state of Tamil Nadu is one of the Department of Government of Tamil Nadu.

Objective and functions 
Transport Department is essential convenience with which people not just connect but progress. Throughout history, people's progress has been sustained on the convenience, speed and safety of the modes of transport.  Road Transport occupies a primary place in today's world as it provides a reach unparalleled by any other contemporary mode of transport.  The Transport Department has control over 7 Transport Undertakings, Tamil Nadu Transport Development Finance Corporation Limited, Pallavan 
Transport Consultancy Services Limited, Institute of Road Transport and Motor Vehicles Maintenance Department. The Transport Department is also the Nodal Agency of the State Government in respect of projects implemented by the Southern Railway, Department of Postal and Telecommunications and the Civil Aviation of the Government of India

Subdepartments

Undertakings and bodies

Present Ministers for Transport 
R. S. Raja Kannappan

S. S. Sivasankar

Former Ministers for Transport 
 2006 - 2011:
 K. N. Nehru - Minister for transportation
 R. Viswanathan - Minister for Prohibition and Excise
 2011 - 2016:
 V. Senthil Balaji,
 P. Mohan (politician), Minister for Rural Industries

See also 
 Government of Tamil Nadu
 Tamil Nadu Government's Departments
 Ministry of Micro, Small and Medium Enterprises
 Department of Finance (Kerala)

References

External links 
 http://www.tn.gov.in/departments/transport.html (Official Website of the Transport Department, Tamil Nadu)
 http://www.tn.gov.in (Official website of Government of Tamil Nadu)
 http://www.tn.gov.in/rti/proact_transport.htm (Tamil Nadu Transport Department RTI)

Tamil Nadu state government departments
Transport in Tamil Nadu
Road authorities
Transport organisations based in India
1811 establishments in India
Tamil Nadu